Conocrambus xuthochroa is a moth in the family Crambidae. It was described by Turner in 1947. It is found in Australia, where it has been recorded from Queensland.

References

Crambinae
Moths described in 1947